Ann or Anna or Anne Davies may refer to:

 Anne Davies (British journalist) (born 1958), presenter for the BBC local news programme East Midlands Today
 Anne Davies (figure skater) (1930–1995), American figure skater
 Anne Davies (Australian journalist), Washington correspondent for Australian newspapers The Age and The Sydney Morning Herald
 Anne Davies (academic), lawyer at the University of Oxford
 Ann Davies (occultist) (1912–1975), American occultist
 Ann Davies (actress) (1934–2022), English actress
 Ann Davies (translator) (1914–1954), British actress and translator
 Ann Catherine Davies (1894–1965), later Ann Horton, British physicist
 Ann Romney (born 1949 as Ann Davies), wife of politician Mitt Romney
 Anna Morpurgo Davies (1937–2014), Italian philologist
Anna Davies, novelist in the Point Horror series, novels include Wrecked and Identity Theft

See also
Ann Davis (disambiguation)